John Golden Richards (born December 31, 1950) is a former professional American football wide receiver in the National Football League (NFL) for the Dallas Cowboys and Chicago Bears. He played college football at Brigham Young University and the University of Hawaii.

Early life
Richards attended Granite High School in South Salt Lake, Utah, where he received All-state honors in 3 sports (football, basketball, track). In football he joined his brother Doug Richards and played fullback. He led the track & field team to the Utah Class A state title. In basketball, he played guard and was named second-team All-state.

After being recruited by different division I colleges, he had decided to attend the University of Utah, but his church bishop influenced Richards to attend BYU instead of serving on a mission.

From the start he was the fastest player on the BYU team and wore number 22 in honor of Bob Hayes. As a sophomore, he led the team in receiving with 36 receptions for 513 yards (fifth among WAC receivers) and 1 touchdown. As a junior, he again led the team in receiving with 14 receptions for 287 yards and 1 touchdown. He also had 33 punt returns for 624 yards (17.9 average) and 4 touchdowns, 23 kickoff returns for 468 yards (19.8 average). He was first in the nation in punt returns and 16th in all-purpose yards. He set four NCAA records with most punt return yards (219 against North Texas St.) in a game, most kickoff returns (247 yards, 7 returns) in a game, average per kickoff return (35.3 yards) in a season and tied the record for most touchdowns (4) on punt returns in a season. He received All-WAC honors.

The combination of being ruled academically ineligible and BYU's run-oriented offense, made him take the decision to transfer to the University of Hawaii for his senior season. As a senior, he had 23 receptions for 414 yards and 5 touchdowns, before injuring his knee.

Professional career

Dallas Cowboys
Richards was selected by the Dallas Cowboys in the second round (46th overall) of the 1973 NFL Draft. As a rookie, he was the fastest player on the team and played mostly on special teams. In the NFC Championship against the Minnesota Vikings, he returned a punt 63 yards for a touchdown.

In 1974, he was named the starter at wide receiver over Bob Hayes. He was the team's long threat (with receptions of 52, 58, 46 and 43 yards) and had his best statistical year with 26 receptions for 467 yards (18 average) and 5 touchdowns. In his third year, he had 21 receptions for 451 yards (21.5 average) and 4 touchdowns. In 1976, he had 19 receptions for 414 yards (21.8 average) and 3 touchdowns, missing 3 games because of a hamstring injury.

The next season, his fourth straight as a starter, he alternated with Butch Johnson, recording 17 receptions for 225 yards (13.2 average) and 3 touchdowns. At the end of the year in Super Bowl XII against the Denver Broncos, he had his most notable career highlight, catching a 29-yard pass from fullback Robert Newhouse for the game-clinching touchdown.

In 1978 with the emergence of Tony Hill, he lost his starting position and was traded to the Chicago Bears, in exchange for a 5th round draft choice (#121-Bob Hukill) in 1979 and a 3rd round draft choice (#78-Bill Roe) in 1980.

Chicago Bears
In 1978, Richards had a career-high 27 receptions with the Chicago Bears. The next season, he played in only 5 games, before suffering a knee injury while blocking on Walter Payton's 65-yard touchdown reception against the Tampa Bay Buccaneers, although he completed the game. His contract wasn't renewed after he was placed on the injured reserve list.

Denver Broncos
On May 8, 1980, he signed as a free agent with the Denver Broncos. He retired after suffering a second straight season-ending injury and being placed on the injured reserve list.

Personal life
Richards was the host and co-producer of a hunting and fishing show for ESPN called "ESPN Outdoors". He was mentioned on "A Beer Can Named Desire" and "Cops and Robert" episodes of the cartoon sitcom King of the Hill.

Richards' post NFL life included drug addiction, alcoholism, three divorces, and arrests for forgery.

In 2011, he was diagnosed with Parkinson's disease, with doctors believing a combination of hits from football and his drug usage to be the causes. He lives with his two sons, Goldie and Jordan.

See also
 List of NCAA major college yearly punt and kickoff return leaders

References

External links
 Going Deep--Into a Hell : Former Cowboy Richards Has Seen Life Become Anything but Golden Because of Drugs

1950 births
Living people
American football return specialists
American football wide receivers
BYU Cougars football players
Chicago Bears players
Dallas Cowboys players
Denver Broncos players
Hawaii Rainbow Warriors football players
Players of American football from Salt Lake City